Yongren County (Chuxiong Yi script: ,) is a county under the administration of the Chuxiong Yi Autonomous Prefecture, in the north of Yunnan province, China, bordering Sichuan province to the northeast.

Administrative divisions
Yongren County has 3 towns, 3 townships and 1 ethnic township. 
3 towns
 Yongding
 Yijiu
 Zhonghe
3 townships
 Lianchi
 Weide
 Menghu
1 ethnic township
 Yongxing Dai

Ethnic groups
Yi subgroups in Yongren County include the Lipo 里颇, Luoluopo 罗罗颇, and Nuosu 诺苏 (Yongren County Gazetteer 1995:95).

Climate

References

External links
Yongren County Official Website

County-level divisions of Chuxiong Prefecture